Bishop Brandram Boileau Ussher, M.D. (August 6, 1845 - 1925) was a bishop of the Reformed Episcopal Church in Montreal.

Biography
He was born on August 6, 1845 in Dublin, Ireland to Captain Richard Beverly Ussher and Henrietta Boileau. He was a descendant of Archbishop Henry Ussher.

He married Elizabeth Leonora Thompson and had five children, Sydney Lahmire Ussher; Clarence Douglas Ussher, Charles E. C. Ussher; George Richard Ussher, and Elizabeth Henrietta Ussher.

He died in 1925.

References

External links
 

1845 births
1925 deaths
Bishops of the Reformed Episcopal Church
American physicians